I'm Just a Girl is the fourth studio album by American country music singer Deana Carter. The album peaked at #6 on the U.S. Top Country Albums chart and #58 on the Billboard 200, and produced two singles. "There's No Limit" was released in late 2002 as the lead single. The song was Carter's first Top 20 hit since "Absence of the Heart" in 1998, when it peaked at #14 on the Billboard Hot Country Singles & Tracks chart in early 2003. The title track was released as the album's second single, which was a minor Top 40 hit. This was Carter's only release on Arista Nashville; she then switched to Vanguard for her next albums. The cover resembles a magazine cover.

"You and Tequila" was later covered by country artist Kenny Chesney for his 2010 album Hemingway's Whiskey. His version was released as the album's fourth single in May 2011.

Track listing

Personnel
 Matraca Berg - acoustic guitar, background vocals
 Bekka Bramlett - background vocals
 Deana Carter - chimes, acoustic guitar, synthesizer, lead vocals, background vocals
 Lisa Cochran - background vocals
 Eric Darken - percussion
 Dan Dugmore - dobro, acoustic guitar, electric guitar, lap steel guitar, pedal steel guitar
 Andrew Gold - background vocals
 John Hobbs - Hammond organ
 Dann Huff - electric guitar, steel guitar
 Chuck Jones - acoustic guitar
 Randy Leago - accordion, clarinet, saxophone, keyboards, Hammond organ, piano
 Chris McHugh - drums
 Billy Mann - electric guitar
 Greg Morrow - drums
 Steve Nathan - keyboards, Hammond organ
 Crystal Taliefero - background vocals
 John Willis - acoustic guitar
 Glenn Worf - bass guitar
 Dwight Yoakam - vocals on "Waiting"
 Jonathan Yudkin - banjo, cello, fiddle, mandolin, strings, background vocals

Chart performance

Album

References

2003 albums
Arista Records albums
Deana Carter albums